This is the list of episodes of The Late Show with Stephen Colbert that aired in 2018.

2018

January

February

March

April

May

June

July

August

September

October

November

December
</onlyinclude>

Notes

External links
 
 Lineups at Interbridge 
 

Episodes 2018
2018 American television seasons
Lists of American non-fiction television series episodes
Lists of variety television series episodes